The Council of American Overseas Research Centers (CAORC) is a private not-for-profit association of centers that research, conserve and record cultural heritage and modern societies.
CAORC, founded in 1981, helps arrange research projects that span national boundaries, in which member centers collaborate.

Funding 

The council is funded in part by the United States Department of State's Bureau of Educational and Cultural Affairs, the Smithsonian Institution, the Andrew W. Mellon Foundation, the Carnegie Corporation of New York, and the Getty Foundation, as well as through fees paid by members.

Fellowships

CAORC offers two fellowship programs, the NEH Senior Research Fellowship and Multi-Country Research Fellowship.

The NEH fellowship supports advanced research in the humanities for U.S. postdoctoral scholars, and foreign national postdoctoral scholars who have been residents in the US for three or more years.

The Multi-Country fellowship supports advanced regional or trans-regional research in the humanities, social sciences, or allied natural sciences for U.S. doctoral candidates and scholars who have already earned their Ph.D.

Under the National Security Language Initiative, the United States Department of State funds scholarships in the Critical Language Scholarship Program that were originally organized by CAORC.

Responsive Preservation Initiative (RPI) for Cultural Heritage Resources 
CAORC administers the Responsive Preservation Initiative (RPI) for Cultural Heritage Resources, supported by the JM Kaplan Fund. The RPI program is designed to fund projects for urgent, emergent, or priority issues that need to be addressed quickly. The program provides grants for rapid emergency projects in Algeria, Cyprus, Egypt, Greece, Iraq, Israel, Jordan, Libya, Morocco, The Palestinian Territories, Tunisia, Turkey, and Yemen.

West African Acquisitions Pilot Project (WAAPP) 
CAORC, in collaboration with the West African Research Association (WARA) and West African Research Center (WARC) in Dakar, Senegal, launched an initiative with the Library of Congress in 2010 to expand the collection of scholarly resources for U.S. and West African universities and institutions by collecting, documenting and digitizing published material and ephemera in eleven countries, including: Benin, Burkina Faso, Côte d'Ivoire, the Gambia, Guinea Conakry, Mali, Niger, Chad, Senegal, Sierra Leone and Togo.

Member Centers

The CAORC Member Centers as of 2022 are:

Afghanistan—The American Institute of Afghanistan Studies (AIAS)
Algeria—The American Institute for Maghrib Studies (AIMS-CEMA)
The Americas—The American Research Network (ARENET)
Bangladesh—The American Institute of Bangladesh Studies (AIBS)
Cambodia The Center for Khmer Studies (CKS)
Cyprus—The Cyprus American Archæological Research Institute (ASOR-CAARI)
Greece—The American School of Classical Studies at Athens (ASCSA)
Egypt—The American Research Center in Egypt (ARCE)
Indonesia—The American Institute for Indonesian Studies (AIFIS)
India—The American Institute of Indian Studies (AIIS)
Iraq—The Academic Research Institute in Iraq (TARII)
Iran—The American Institute of Iranian Studies (AIIrS)
Italy—The American Academy in Rome (AAR)
Jerusalem—The W.F. Albright Institute of Archæological Research (ASOR-AIAR)
Jordan—The American Center of Research (ASOR-ACOR)
Mongolia—The American Center for Mongolian Studies (ACMS)
Morocco—The American Institute for Maghrib Studies (AIMS-TALIM)
Myanmar (Burma)--The Inya Institute (Inya)
Nepal—The Association for Nepal and Himalayan Studies (ANHS)
Pakistan—The American Institute of Pakistan Studies (AIPS)
Palestine—The Palestinian American Research Center (PARC)
Senegal—The West African Research Association (WARA)
South Caucasus—The American Research Institute of the South Caucasus (ARISC)
Sri Lanka—The American Institute for Sri Lankan Studies (AISLS)
Tunisia—The American Institute for Maghrib Studies (AIMS-CEMAT)
Turkey—The American Research Institute in Turkey (ARIT)
Yemen—The American Institute for Yemeni Studies (AIYS)

References

 
Bureau of Educational and Cultural Affairs